The Journal of the History of International Law (French: Revue d’histoire du droit international) is a biannual peer-reviewed academic journal covering the history of international law. It is published by Martinus Nijhoff Publishers and the Max Planck Institute for Comparative Public Law and International Law, Heidelberg. The journal is abstracted and indexed by Scopus.

References

External links 
 

Legal history journals
International law journals
Multilingual journals
Biannual journals
Brill Publishers academic journals
Publications established in 1999